Vjačeslavs Isajevs (born 27 August 1993) is a Latvian footballer who plays as a defender for FK Auda. He was capped once for the Latvia national team.

International career
Isajevs made his international debut for Latvia on 9 September 2018, starting in the 2018–19 UEFA Nations League D match against Georgia, which finished as a 0–1 away loss.

References

External links
 
 Vjačeslavs Isajevs at LFF.lv
 
 

1993 births
Living people
Footballers from Riga
Latvian footballers
Latvia international footballers
Latvia under-21 international footballers
Latvia youth international footballers
Association football defenders
JFK Olimps players
Skonto FC players
FK RFS players
FK Liepāja players
FK Auda players
Latvian Higher League players